Wingegyps is an extinct genus of tiny condor from the Late Pleistocene of South America. The type species W. cartellei was described from cave deposits in the states of Bahia and Minas Gerais, Brazil. It was close related to the genera Vultur and Gymnogyps, particularly the former.

The genus is named after Danish ornithologist Oluf Winge, who first described the remains in 1888, without attributing a new scientific name.

References 

Cathartidae
Quaternary birds of South America
Pleistocene animals of South America
Ensenadan
Lujanian
Pleistocene Brazil
Fossils of Brazil
Fossil taxa described in 2004
Prehistoric bird genera
Extinct monotypic bird genera